Flagstaff Pulliam Airport  is  south of Flagstaff, in Coconino County, Arizona, United States. The airport is serviced by American Eagle , and is also used for general aviation. Federal Aviation Administration records say the airport had 51,765 passenger boardings (enplanements) in calendar year 2008, 66,627 in 2009 and 62,109 in 2010. The National Plan of Integrated Airport Systems for 2011–2015 called it a "primary commercial service" airport (more than 10,000 enplanements per year). It is the closest airport to Grand Canyon National Park with service by legacy carriers.

Facilities
The airport was built in 1948, and named after Clarence T. Maggie Pulliam, a former Flagstaff city manager who worked for the city for 44 years.

Its one runway, 3/21, is  asphalt.

In the year ending December 31, 2017, the airport had 43,527 aircraft operations, an average of 119 per day: 67% general aviation, 25% air taxi, 2% military, and 5% airline. 115 aircraft were then based at the airport: 88% single-engine, 5% multi-engine, 3% jet, 3% helicopter, and 2% ultralight.

Airlines and destinations

Passenger

Top domestic destinations

Historical airline service
Flagstaff was served in the late 1940s by Arizona Airways, which merged into Frontier Airlines in 1950. Douglas DC-3 and Convair 340 prop aircraft as well as Convair 580 turboprops were operated on flights to Phoenix as well as direct, no change of plane service to Denver via Gallup, New Mexico, Farmington, New Mexico and Durango, Colorado. Occasionally over the years, direct flights were also operated to Albuquerque via Winslow, Arizona and Gallup, New Mexico. Frontier's service ended in 1979.

Several commuter airlines served Flagstaff in the 1970s and early 1980s with flights primarily to Phoenix. These included Cochise Airlines, Desert Air Service, Desert Pacific Airlines, SunWest Airlines, and SkyWest Airlines. These airlines operated commuter prop and turboprop aircraft including Fairchild Swearingen Metroliners, Beechcraft C99s, de Havilland Canada DHC-6 Twin Otters, Cessna 402s, and Piper Navajos. Cochise Airlines served Flagstaff from 1973 through 1979 with flights to Phoenix. SunWest Airlines provided service from 1982 through 1985 with flights to Phoenix and to Albuquerque with a stop in Gallup, New Mexico. SkyWest Airlines started service in the late 1970s operating independently at first and then in 1986 began operating as Western Express on behalf of Western Airlines. In 1987 Western merged into Delta Air Lines which resulted in the SkyWest code share service being operated as the Delta Connection. SkyWest continued flying between Flagstaff and Phoenix as well as operating flights to Las Vegas with stops in Page, Arizona and St. George, Utah using the Swearingen Metroliner until 1994. American Eagle, operated by Wings West Airlines, served Flagstaff on behalf of American Airlines from 1986 through 1987 also using Fairchild Swearingen Metroliner turboprops to Phoenix.

America West Airlines began service in 1987 using de Havilland Canada DHC-8 Dash 8 turboprops flying to the carrier's hubs in Phoenix and Las Vegas with the latter service being operated via a stop at the Grand Canyon National Park Airport. America West Boeing 737-200 jetliners appeared occasionally at the airport as a back-up for their Dash 8 service. America West then turned this operation over to Mesa Airlines in 1992 which flew Beechcraft 1900D and occasionally Embraer EMB-120 Brasilia turboprops as America West Express between Flagstaff and Phoenix. In 1996 up to 16 daily flights were operated to Phoenix, one every hour. Flights were upgraded back to Dash 8 aircraft in 1998 and America West then merged with US Airways in 2007 which in turn continued to serve Flagstaff as US Airways Express with flights to Phoenix. In 2012 all flights were upgraded to 50-seat Canadair CRJ-200 regional jets which marked the first time that flights serving Flagstaff were operated on a regularly scheduled basis with jet aircraft. US Airways was subsequently merged into American Airlines in 2015 which then saw a return of American Eagle service. The Phoenix flights were upgraded once again in 2017 to 70-seat Canadair CRJ-700s operated by SkyWest Airlines. During the summer of 2018, a single flight was operated to Los Angeles on Saturdays only using a SkyWest CRJ-700 operating as American Eagle.

Horizon Air, a subsidiary of the Alaska Air Group (which also operates Alaska Airlines), operated Bombardier Q400 flights to Los Angeles, some stopping in Prescott, Arizona, from 2008 through 2010. The 76-seat Q400 is the largest and fastest member of the DHC-8 Dash 8 family of aircraft.

Current air service
SkyWest Airlines operating as American Eagle continues to operate scheduled passenger flights serving the airport with Canadair CRJ-700 regional jets to the American Airlines hub at Phoenix Sky Harbor International Airport and added new flights to Dallas Fort Worth International Airport on April 2, 2019. Occasionally some Phoenix flights are operated by Mesa Airlines using the 76-seat Canadair CRJ-900 regional jet.

Trans States Airlines, operating as United Express via a code sharing agreement with United Airlines, began flights on March 31, 2019 from Flagstaff to the United Airlines hub at Denver International Airport. Twice daily round-trip flights were initially being flown with Embraer ERJ-145 regional jet aircraft. Trans States was shut down in 2020 and CommutAir provided United Express service between the airport and Denver using Embraer ERJ-145 regional jets through October 2022.

Accidents at or near FLG
On January 11, 1995, an Empire Airlines Cessna 208 Caravan crashed 2 km (1.3 miles) SSE of FLG due to incorrectly configuring the aircraft fuel system prior to takeoff and impacting trees attempting to return to the airport. The sole occupant, the pilot, was killed.

References

External links
 Flagstaff Pulliam Airport at City of Flagstaff website
 Flagstaff Pulliam Airport (FLG) at Arizona DOT airport directory
 Wiseman Aviation, the fixed-base operator (FBO)
 Aerial image as of October 1997 from USGS The National Map
 
 
 
 

Airports in Coconino County, Arizona
Buildings and structures in Flagstaff, Arizona